Johan Oviedo (born March 2, 1998) is a Cuban professional baseball pitcher for the Pittsburgh Pirates of Major League Baseball (MLB). He has previously played in MLB for the St. Louis Cardinals.

Career

St. Louis Cardinals

On July 2, 2016, Oviedo signed with the St. Louis Cardinals as an international free agent and was assigned to the DSL Cardinals. He split 2017 with the Johnson City Cardinals and the State College Spikes. In 2018, he was promoted to the Peoria Chiefs, where he would spend the season. He then spent the 2019 season with the Springfield Cardinals. 

Oviedo was assigned to the Triple-A Memphis Redbirds to begin the 2020 season, but due to the COVID-19 pandemic, Minor League Baseball did not have a season and was added to the newly formed 60-man player pool.

Oviedo was selected to the active roster on August 19, 2020 and made his MLB debut that day. Over five starts with St. Louis, he went 0–3 with a 5.47 ERA, striking out 16 over  innings. After making 19 starts and 24 total appearances without earning a win, Oviedo earned his first career win on June 22, 2022, against the Milwaukee Brewers, pitching  scoreless innings out of the bullpen and striking out three.

Pittsburgh Pirates

On August 1, 2022, Oviedo and Malcom Núñez were traded to the Pittsburgh Pirates for José Quintana and Chris Stratton.

References

External links

1998 births
Living people
Dominican Summer League Cardinals players
Cuban expatriate baseball players in the Dominican Republic
Johnson City Cardinals players
Major League Baseball pitchers
Major League Baseball players from Cuba
Cuban expatriate baseball players in the United States
Palm Beach Cardinals players
Peoria Chiefs players
Pittsburgh Pirates players
Baseball players from Havana
Springfield Cardinals players
St. Louis Cardinals players
State College Spikes players